David Dill may refer to:

David Bruce Dill (1891–1986), American physiologist
David K. Dill (1955–2015), American politician
David L. Dill (born 1957), American computer scientist